Boy is a 2009 Philippine film by director Auraeus Solito. The 83-minute film produced by recounts a young poet's infatuation with a young macho dancer.

Boy (also as BoY) has been shown in many international film festivals. The Board of Film Censors in Singapore banned the showing of the movie because it "normalizes homosexuality and romanticizes sex between men." Boy was screened in the Philippines in June 2009.

Cast
Aeious Asin - Boy
Aries Pena - Aries
Madelaine Nicolas - Boy's mother
Nonie Buencamino - Aries father
Danton Remoto - Teacher

Festivals
Boy had its world premiere in Italy at the Torino Gay and Lesbian Film Festival (April 2009). Other festival screenings included:
Outfest Los Angeles Gay and Lesbian Film Festival
Jeonju International Film Festival in South Korea (Asian premiere)
ImagineNATIVE Film and Media Arts Festival in Toronto (Canadian premiere)
Image+Nation Montreal
Frameline Film Festival (San Francisco International Lesbian and Gay Film Festival)
Seattle International Film Festival

References

External links
 
 
 Boy page on Film Development Council of the Philippines site

2009 films
Filipino-language films
Gay-related films
Philippine LGBT-related films
LGBT-related drama films
2009 LGBT-related films
2009 drama films
Philippine drama films
LGBT-related controversies in film
Film controversies in Singapore